Alessandro Pizzorno (Trieste, 1 January 1924 – Florence, 4 April 2019) was an Italian sociologist, political scientist and philosopher.

Career 
He completed his philosophy studies at the University of Turin, and in social sciences in Vienna and Paris.

In 1953 he took over the management of the Olivetti Industrial Relations Center in Ivrea.

He taught at major Italian and foreign universities: University of Urbino, Milan State University, Oxford University (Nuffield College), Harvard University, Tehran University and at the European University Institute (I.U.E.) of Fiesole.

Pizzorno, in addition to studies on sociological matters, has conducted research on economic and political sociology, especially on trade unions and class conflicts, on Italian politics and its aspects, on the relationships between political and economic systems in industrial societies.

He was awarded some prizes, including the Medal of the President of the Republic and the Pisa Literary National Award. He died on 4 April 2019 at the age of 95.

References 

1924 births
2019 deaths
Italian sociologists
University of Turin alumni
21st-century Italian philosophers
20th-century Italian philosophers
Italian political scientists